Acrocercops ficina is a moth of the family Gracillariidae. It is known from South Africa and Namibia.

The larvae feed on Ficus hippopotami, Ficus natalensis and Ficus trichopoda. They mine the leaves of their host plant. The mine has the form of a moderate, irregular, whitish, epidermal blotch-mine on the upperside of the leaf.

References

ficina
Moths of Africa
Moths described in 1961
Insects of Namibia